The following is a list of recorded songs by the American rock band My Chemical Romance.

Songs

Notes

References

See also
 My Chemical Romance discography

My Chemical Romance songs
My Chemical Romance